Alone in the Dark is a survival horror video game series.

Alone in the Dark may also refer to:

Films
Alone in the Dark (1978 film), a 1978 Spanish film
Alone in the Dark (1982 film), a 1982 horror film
Alone in the Dark (2005 film), a 2005 horror film loosely based on the video game series
Alone in the Dark II (film), a 2008 horror film sequel to the 2005 film

Video games
Alone in the Dark (1992 video game), the first in the series of Alone in the Dark video games
Alone in the Dark 2 (1993 video game), sequel to the first video game
Alone in the Dark 3, sequel to the second video game, released in 1994
Alone in the Dark: The New Nightmare, 2001 video game
Alone in the Dark (2008 video game)

Music
"Alone in the Dark", a song by American thrash-metal band Testament from their 1987 album The Legacy
"Alone in the Dark", a song by John Hiatt from his 1987 album Bring the Family

"Alone in the Darkness", a song by All That Remains from their 2018 album Victim of the New Disease